Lamproxynella separata is a species of tephritid or fruit flies in the genus Lamproxynella of the family Tephritidae.

Distribution
Argentina, Brazi.

References

Tephritinae
Insects described in 1933
Taxa named by John Russell Malloch
Diptera of South America